Kaloyanov Peak is the rocky, partly ice-free peak rising to 705 m in southeastern Poibrene Heights on Blagoevgrad Peninsula, Oscar II Coast, Graham Land in Antarctica.  It is overlooking Exasperation Inlet to the southwest.

The feature is named after Stefan Kaloyanov, radioman in the first Bulgarian Antarctic campaign in 1987/88.

Location

Maps
 Antarctic Digital Database (ADD). Scale 1:250000 topographic map of Antarctica. Scientific Committee on Antarctic Research (SCAR). Since 1993, regularly upgraded and updated.

Notes

References
 Kaloyanov Peak. SCAR Composite Antarctic Gazetteer.
 Bulgarian Antarctic Gazetteer. Antarctic Place-names Commission. (details in Bulgarian, basic data in English)

External links
 Kaloyanov Peak. Copernix satellite image

Mountains of Graham Land
Oscar II Coast
Bulgaria and the Antarctic